Rear Admiral Louis Kempff (October 11, 1841 – July 29, 1920) was an officer of the United States Navy from 1857 to 1903.

Biography
Louis Kempff was born in Belleville, Illinois, United States, to parents Frederick and Henriette Kempff, both from Germany.  After passing the entrance exams, he received an appointment to the United States Naval Academy at Annapolis, Maryland, on September 21, 1857.

Civil War
Towards the end of his senior year at Annapolis, the American Civil War erupted and Kempff was detached from the Naval Academy and called into active service in May 1861. On November 7, 1861, Kempff participated in the Battle of Port Royal, near Hilton Head Island, South Carolina.

Later Naval career
Following the Civil War, Kempff continued serving aboard the Suwanee; on July 25, 1866, Kempff was promoted to the rank of lieutenant commander. On March 7, 1876, Kempff was promoted to commander. Kempff was thereafter assigned to the Mare Island Navy Yard and Station where he served as commander of the station's Department of Equipment and Recruiting. Kempff subsequently served on the Board of Inspection and Survey in San Francisco, California, during which time he was promoted to captain. Kempff's final promotion came on March 3, 1899, when he was promoted to the rank of rear admiral.

Boxer Rebellion

Later life
Following his service in the Boxer Rebellion, Kempff continued to serve in the United States Navy; following the events of the Boxer Rebellion, Kempff became the Commandant–in–charge of the Pacific Naval District. Kempff continued in this capacity until his retirement in 1903. Following his retirement form military service, Kempff became an active participant in the Military Order of the Loyal Legion of the United States.

References

External links
 

United States Navy admirals
1841 births
1920 deaths
United States Naval Academy alumni
Union Navy officers